Conus philippii, common name Philppi's cone, is a species of sea snail, a marine gastropod mollusk in the family Conidae, the cone snails and their allies.

Like all species within the genus Conus, these snails are predatory and venomous. They are capable of "stinging" humans, therefore live ones should be handled carefully or not at all.

Distribution
This species occurs in the Caribbean Sea.

Description 
The maximum recorded shell length is 36 mm.

Habitat 
Minimum recorded depth is 65 m. Maximum recorded depth is 65 m.

References

 Kiener L.C. 1844–1850. Spécies général et iconographie des coquilles vivantes. Vol. 2. Famille des Enroulées. Genre Cone (Conus, Lam.), pp. 1–379, pl. 1-111 [pp. 1–48 (1846); 49–160 (1847); 161–192 (1848); 193–240 (1849); 241-[379(assumed to be 1850); plates 4,6 (1844); 2–3, 5, 7–32, 34–36, 38, 40–50 (1845); 33, 37, 39, 51–52, 54–56, 57–68, 74–77 (1846); 1, 69–73, 78–103 (1847); 104–106 (1848); 107 (1849); 108–111 (1850)]
  Puillandre N., Duda T.F., Meyer C., Olivera B.M. & Bouchet P. (2015). One, four or 100 genera? A new classification of the cone snails. Journal of Molluscan Studies. 81: 1–23

External links
 The Conus Biodiversity website
 Cone Shells – Knights of the Sea

philippii
Gastropods described in 1845